Aaryamaan - Brahmaand Ka Yoddha is an Indian superhero space opera TV series that aired on DD National. It was produced under the banner of Bheeshm International by Mukesh Khanna. It held the record of the most expensive Indian television drama ever for a short period.

Premise
The series follows the story of Aryamaan (Mukesh Khanna), the warrior Prince of the human inhabited Thar Empire of the Aariyana galaxy, situated millions of light years away from Earth. Aryamaan, son of Emperor Jarant and the Emperor's second wife Queen Rasa, is the rightful heir to the throne of the Thar Empire. When Aryamaan was born, the drought-struck Aariyana experienced its first showers in many years. The distressed civilians looked up to the boy and believed that he is their saviour and will tide them over in all adverse situations.

However, Aryamaan's step-mother and Emperor Jarant's first-wife queen Nasa gets extremely jealous of Rasa and Aryamaan. She also gives birth to a mutated non-human child simultaneously when Rasa gives birth to Aryamaan. A further jealous Nasa makes more than one attempt to kill the baby Aryamaan. Queen Rasa realizes that as long as Aryamaan lives with her in Thar, there is danger to his life. She instead instructs a helper robot called Tobo to take the child to planet Gurukshetra, where the 750-year-old Hoshin, a direct descendant of the great Ariyan would raise Aryamaan. Hoshin trains Aryamaan in fighting and other practices of a warrior. After learning all he has to learn from Hoshin, Aryamaan receives a special armour suit, which can be opened from its showcase only by Aryamaan's hand print.  Aryamaan first visits his Thar planet and finds out that Emperor Jarant has been overthrown by Nasa, appointing her half-human, half-beast son as a dummy king while making her the Royal Mother. Aryamaan meets his parents, who have been imprisoned and chained to work in the mines of Thar. Unable to do anything at the moment, Aryamaan sets out to various planets in search of a powerful weapon called Chandrahaas, to win back his lost kingdom. Along the way, has to confront his stepmother Queen Nasa, Shukrant, Narak and other evil villains.

Cast 
 Mukesh Khanna as Prince Aryamaan
 Kiran Kumar as Mahan Hoshin (Aryamaan's guru)
 Shantipriya as Teji
 Manjeet Kullar as Queen Nasa
 Deep Dhillon as King Durdan
 Reshma Modi as Queen Rasa
 Sudhir Mittu as King Jarant
 Deepak Jethi as Mahasamant Naarak
 Murli Sharma as Sukrant
 Shalini Arora as Paap Shakti Rakshindra
 Tarakesh Chauhan as King Son
 Brownie Parashar as Kurbak

Background and production

According to Mukesh Khanna, unlike Shaktimaan, the drama had a wider appeal, targeting all sections of television viewers in India and its production values are ten times bigger than that of the Shaktimaan. He also described the show as the "Indian version of the famous Star Wars". The special effects were created by Crest Communications. The cost of production is said to be about Rs. 15 lakhs-Rs. 20 lakhs per episode. The team chose RK Studios for a month and Natraj Film Studio "to put up massive sets, including a spaceship with detailed interiors, including fake switchboards and consoles". The rest of the area was converted into a storage space for the costumes and props such as swords and lightsabers.

Soundtrack
The title song is given by Pyarelal Ramprasad Sharma of the Laxmikant–Pyarelal. According to him, the opening theme contains a balanced fusion between Indian melody and Western music.

Broadcast
The drama started on 14 July 2002 on DD National. In the summer of 2006 reruns of the series aired on Jetix.

References

External links 
 
Aryaman episodes on YouTube

Television superheroes
2002 Indian television series debuts
Indian science fiction television series
Indian children's television series
DD National original programming
Science fantasy television series
Space adventure television series
Indian fantasy television series
Indian superhero television shows
Jetix original programming
Indian action television series